Estádio de Campo Grande was a multi-use stadium in Lisbon, Portugal. It was used mostly for football matches and hosted the home matches of Sporting CP and then S.L. Benfica. The stadium was able to hold 25,000 people and opened in 1912 owned by Lisboa FC. In 1917, Lisboa FC leaves and ground is taken over by Sporting CP which uses it until 1937, leaving for Estádio do Lumiar.

In 1941, Benfica moved in after Estádio das Amoreiras was demolished for a freeway. By then, the stadium needed renovations and was abandoned for over 3 years. It was closed in 1954 when the original Estádio da Luz opened.

References

External links
History by Sporting CP  (archived)

Campo Grande
Campo Grande
Sporting CP
Sports venues completed in 1912
Sports venues demolished in 1955